The 2021–22 Presbyterian Blue Hose men's basketball team represented Presbyterian College during the 2021–22 NCAA Division I men's basketball season. The team was led by third-year head coach Quinton Ferrell, and played their home games at Templeton Physical Education Center in Clinton, South Carolina as members of the Big South Conference. The Hose finished the season 12–20, 4–12 in Big South play to finish in fifth place in the South division. As the No. 11 seed in the Big South tournament, they lost to Campbell in the first round.

Previous season
In a season limited due to the ongoing COVID-19 pandemic, the Blue Hose finished the 2020–21 season 7–15, 5–12 in Big South play to finish in tenth place. They lost in the first round of the Big South tournament to Hampton.

Roster

Schedule and results

|-
!colspan=12 style=|Non-conference regular season

|-
!colspan=9 style=| Big South Conference regular season

|-
!colspan=9 style=|Big South tournament

|-

Source

References

Presbyterian Blue Hose men's basketball seasons
Presbyterian Blue Hose
Presbyterian Blue Hose men's basketball
Presbyterian Blue Hose men's basketball